Mothusi Johnson (born 28 July 1997) is a Motswana international footballer who plays for Orapa United as a left back.

Career
Born in Gaborone, Johnson has played club football for TAFIC, Gaborone United and Orapa United.

He made his international debut for Botswana in 2019. In November 2019 he was one of four Botswana international players dropped from the national team after they had been drinking alcohol.

References

1997 births
Living people
Botswana footballers
Botswana international footballers
TAFIC F.C. players
Gaborone United S.C. players
Orapa United F.C. players
Association football fullbacks